The Haijby scandal (Haijbyaffären) was a political affair in Sweden in the 1950s, involving the conviction and imprisonment of restaurateur Kurt Haijby for the supposed blackmail of King Gustaf V. Haijby claimed that he had a secret homosexual relationship with the King in the 1930s.

Background 
Kurt Haijby was born in Stockholm in 1897 as Kurt Johansson, and died there in 1965. His father was a wine merchant and a fishmonger by appointment to the Royal Court. In 1912, while selling "majblomma" charity pins, Kurt and another boy scout were granted an audience with King Gustaf V of Sweden.

Johansson later worked as a waiter, clerk, actor, and illusionist. He was convicted to hard labour six times for several cases of theft and fraud between 1915 and 1925. While trying to escape prison in 1923 he shot and killed a police officer. After being released, he changed his name to Haijby and spent a nomadic life in France and the United States.

In 1931, he opened a restaurant with his second wife Anna, a widow ten years his senior. Since he was a convicted criminal, he could not get a license to sell wine. He then applied to the King and was granted an audience in 1933 to put forward his case. During this royal audience, King Gustav V, a 75-year-old widower, allegedly seduced Haijby.

Haijby's wife, on learning about this in 1936, filed for divorce, citing her husband's homosexual relationship with the King as cause for divorce. Fearing that this would become known, officials of the Royal Court convinced the couple to settle for an amicable no-fault divorce and separation by paying Anna Haijby 15,000 kronor. Despite their legal separation, the couple continued to live together until her death. According to a report, the King said to his Court Superintendent: "There must not be a scandal, but do it with as little money as possible".

Haijby was given 1,500 kronor by the Royal Court lawyers and encouraged to emigrate to the United States, where he was to receive additional 3,000 kronor and start a new life. However, when he arrived in the US, he claimed there was no money for him. He had to return to Sweden where he once again asked for support from the Royal Court.

For several years, money from the Court financed a number of Haijby's failed enterprises, including a coffee store and a boarding house at the Trystorp estate. There is no evidence of outright blackmail on Haijby's part, but it can be argued that the Court was attempting to buy his silence. In all, Haijby received 170,000 Swedish kronor (equivalent to  kronor in 2009) from the Court and perhaps much more from the King's private funds.

Haijby later claimed that he was the King's lover in the years between 1936 and 1947.

In 1938 Haijby was arrested for child sexual abuse of an 11-year old and a 13-year-old boy and put in custody at the asylum of Beckomberga. This was the result of political pressure from the Governor of Stockholm, Torsten Nothin. The psychiatrist in charge of the asylum did not believe that Haijby was in need of psychiatric care and he was eventually discharged. The child abuse case was never brought to a criminal court.

In 1939, a new deal was arranged in which Haijby was forced to emigrate to Nazi Germany. After a short while in Berlin, he was put in prison by the Gestapo, probably by request of the Swedish Court. Unlike most Gestapo prisoners, Haijby was not tortured and, most of the time, kept in decent conditions. Charges were then brought against him for sexual relations with two young boys. He was sentenced to prison and banished to Sweden in 1940 after having served his sentence.

He was reunited with his ex-wife, who gave him a grant using a police officer as a middleman. Haijby was however made to believe that the money came from the Court. Haijby was again, because of political pressure, committed to an asylum in 1941.

In the meantime, another scandal, the Kejne affair, had broken in the press where Vilhelm Moberg wrote lengthy articles about homosexual conspiracies among Swedish officials.

In 1947, Haijby used his own money to publish a roman à clef. Half of the first printing of 1,000 copies was bought by the Chief Constable, funded by the Royal Court. Haijby's ex-wife Anna bought the remainder.

The scandal 

Haijby reported his forced detention in the asylum at Beckomberga to the Attorney General of Sweden. These papers were immediately classified but were smuggled out of the Attorney General's office by Vilhelm Moberg, and the whole affair thus came to public attention. The actions of officials to suppress the claims caused acrimonious debate in parliament and the media. As a consequence, the criminal court charged Haijby for acts of blackmail.

In 1952, after a dubiously held trial, Haijby was sentenced to eight years of hard labour for blackmail under aggravated circumstances, which in 1953 was reduced to six years by the Svea Court of Appeal.

After the death of King Gustav V in 1950, the confiscated roman à clef was re-distributed in 1952 and was reprinted in 1979.

Haijby had reported the treatment he had received to the Swedish Chancellor of Justice. The results of the investigations, the bulk of which were classified until 2002, effectively acquitted the monarchy. There is nothing to support the claim that Haijby was seduced by the King as a 14-year-old boy, but most commentators believe that he had a sexual relationship with the King in the 1930s. Haijby committed suicide in 1965, one year after the death of Anna Haijby.

However, the fact that the Swedish Court was prepared to pay Haijby such large sums to suppress his accusations has by some been taken as evidence that they were true. Later, several servants at the Royal Court, among them a male servant and chauffeurs, claimed that they were given money to keep quiet concerning their own intimate contacts with the King.

Further reading 
 
 
  Originally published in 1947.

References

External links 

 Gustav V, King of Sweden (1858-1950) GLBTQ
 En vargunge och hans majblommor Ett par rader om en fingerad skilsmässa, ett skumt rättsfall, en nervös hovkamarilla och en överskattad myndighetskritiker, Mats Parner, Folket i Bild, Kulturfront, 2007-12-15
 review by Lars Linder of Lena Ebervall and Per E. Samuelson's Ers majestäts olycklige Kurt (Your Majesty's Unhappy Kurt) in Dagens Nyheter (The News of the Day), Stockholm, April 9, 2008
 review by Per Svensson of Lena Ebervall och Per Samuelsson's Ers Majestäts olycklige Kurt in Expressen (The Express), Stockholm, September 3, 2008
 Lotta Lundberg, review of Lena Ebervall & Per E Samuelson's Ers majestäts olycklige Kurt, Sydsvenskan (The South Swede), Malmö, September 2, 2008

Political scandals in Sweden
LGBT history in Sweden
LGBT-related political scandals